Elemento is a 2014 Philippine television docudrama horror anthology broadcast by GMA Network. It premiered on October 10, 2014 on the network's Telebabad line up. The show concluded on October 31, 2014 with a total of 4 episodes.

The series is streaming online on YouTube.

Cast and characters
"Si Esperanza, Ang Rebeldeng Manananggal"
 Glaiza de Castro as Esperanza
 Valerie Concepcion as Lucida
 Maria Isabel Lopez as Esperanza's mother

"Ang Masayahing Kapre na si Itim"
 Raul Dillo as Itim
 Bodjie Pascua
 Ping Medina
 Irma Adlawan
 Lou Veloso
 Joshen Bernardo
 Kyle Ocampo
 Milkah Nacion
 Micko Laurente

"Pandora, Ang Diwata ng Wawa"
 Solenn Heussaff as Pandora
 Carlos Agassi as James

"Apoy ni Bambolito"
 Mike "Pekto" Nacua as Bambolito
 Kristofer Martin
 Bela Padilla
 Rochelle Pangilinan
 Eula Valdez

Ratings
According to AGB Nielsen Philippines' Mega Manila household television ratings, the pilot episode of Elemento earned a 16.1% rating. While the final episode scored a 14.3% rating.

References

External links
 

2014 Philippine television series debuts
2014 Philippine television series endings
Filipino-language television shows
GMA Network original programming
GMA Integrated News and Public Affairs shows
Philippine anthology television series